Sandwiched Forever is a 2020 Indian comedy-drama web television series that premiered on SonyLIV on 25 December 2020. The series chronicles the life of a young couple, Sameer and Naina, whose life changes after their marriage due to constant interference of their parents. This 15 episode series has some real moments of humour that viewers can engage easily. This situational comedy which is written by Bharat Kukreti, Pankaj Sudheer Mishra & Devang Kakkad shows the confrontation between the ideologies of both generations.

Plot
Sameer and Naina are a young couple who are going to get married. Naina is a national-level badminton player and Sameer is a game developer. Naina is a fit sports person whereas Sameer is very lazy. Their life changes after their marriage due to constant interference of their parents. Their privacy after their marriage goes for a toss as their house is sandwiched between the house of Sameer's parents and Naina's parents. Every episode of the 15-episode series finds Sameer and Naina in a different pickle that they have to wiggle out from, leading to hilarious situations.

Important facts

Sandwiched Forever is a true blue sitcom which was shot with a multi camera setup. The actors rehearsed the complete scene and performed it as they would in a theatre (play) performance.
Initially the producers were to have a live audience during filming the show like it is done in the west but due to Covid 2019 the plans had to change.

Cast
 Kunaal Roy Kapur as Sameer Shastri
 Aahana Kumra as Naina Sarnaik
 Atul Kulkarni as V.K. Sarnaik
 Zakir Hussain as Giriraj Shastri
 Lubna Salim as Manjari Sarnaik
 Divya Seth as Sanyukta Shastri
 Mehul Nisar in various roles

Episodes

References

External links
 Sandwiched Forever  on Sony Liv
 Sandwiched Forever  on IMDb
Know more about Sandwiched forever Cast & Plot

2020 Indian television series debuts
Hindi television content related lists